is a chain of restaurants, including , which sells  gyūdon (or gyūmeshi), Japanese curry, and teishoku. Matsuya was established in Japan in 1966, founded by Toshio Kawarabuki. , Matsuya has 1,080 restaurants throughout 33 Japanese prefectures. Overseas stores can be found in China and Taiwan. In addition to Matsuya, the company operates a chain of restaurants including curry, tonkatsu, sushi, and Chinese restaurants.

Popular culture

Matsuya has been a long-time sponsor of the Yakuza videogame franchise, and the game's staple location of Kamurocho has always featured two Matsuya-based restaurants.

See also
Donburi
Sukiya
Yoshinoya

References

External links

 Matsuya

Companies listed on the Tokyo Stock Exchange
Fast-food chains of Japan
Restaurants established in 1966
Restaurants in China
Japanese companies established in 1966